Alex or Alexander Bennett may refer to:
 Alex Bennett (broadcaster) (born 1939), American talk radio host
 Alex Bennett (footballer) (1881–1940), Scottish footballer
 Alex Bennett (Home and Away), fictional character in the Australian soap opera Home and Away
Alex Bennett (swimmer) (born 1977), English swimmer
 Alexander Bennett (dancer) (1929–2003), British ballet dancer and choreographer
Alex Bennett (actor) in Zanna, Don't!
Alex Bennett (sailor); see Transat Jacques Vabre